Hellinsia argutus is a moth of the family Pterophoridae. It is found in Colombia, Ecuador and Peru.

The forewings are shining ochreous‑white, but more whitish near the wing base and more ochreous near the apices. The hindwings are grey‑white and the fringes are white. Adults are on wing in April, May, June and October, at altitudes from 2,000 to 3,450 m.

References

argutus
Moths described in 1926
Moths of South America